No More Mr. Nice Guy may refer to:

Music

 "No More Mr. Nice Guys", a song from Halfnelson by Sparks, 1971
 "No More Mr. Nice Guy" (song), by Alice Cooper, 1973, later covered by Megadeth
 No More Mr. Nice Guy (Gang Starr album), 1989
 No More Mr. Nice Guy (Steve Wariner album), 1996
 In a Metal Mood: No More Mr. Nice Guy, a 1997 album by Pat Boone
 "No More Mr. Nice Guy", a song sung by the character Rothbart in the 1994 animated feature The Swan Princess. Dr. John also sang this song for The Swan Princess: Music from the Motion Picture soundtrack

Film and television
 No More Mr. Nice Guy (film), a 1993 German film
 "No More Mr. Nice Guy" (Freddy's Nightmares), the first episode of the first season of Freddy's Nightmares
 "No More Mr. Nice Guy" (House), the thirteenth episode of the fourth season of House, and the eighty-third episode overall
 "No More Mr. Nice Guy", a Welcome Back, Kotter episode
 "No More Mr. Nice Guy", a Dukes of Hazzard episode

Other uses

 No More Mr. Nice Guy: A Proven Plan for Getting What You Want in Love, Sex, and Life, 2003 book by Robert A. Glover
 No More Mr Nice Guy, a spaceship (and its artificial mind) in Ian M. Banks' novel Consider Phlebas
 No More Mr. Nice Guy, a novel by Howard Jacobson

See also
 Mr. Nice Guy (disambiguation)